The Ilhas do Abrigo e Guararitama Wildlife Refuge ( is a wildlife refuge off the south coast of the state of São Paulo Brazil.

Location

The Ilhas do Abrigo e Guararitama Wildlife Refuge is in the Atlantic Ocean to the east of Peruíbe, São Paulo.
The refuge is opposite the mouth of the Guaraú River. 
The Itinguçu State Park is to the southeast.

Environment

The islands have no beaches, but are surrounded by rocky headlands. 
Their vegetation is Atlantic Forest.
They provide food, shelter and nesting sites for many bird species including the kelp gull (Larus dominicanus), royal tern (Thalasseus maximus) and South American tern (Sterna hirundinacea). Abrigo island is an important resting place for the magnificent frigatebird (Fregata magnificens).

History

The Juréia-Itatins Mosaic of conservation units  was created by law 12.406 of 12 December 2006.
It included the Juréia-Itatins Ecological Station and the newly created Itinguçu and Prelado state parks, the Despraiado and Barra do Una sustainable development reserves and the Ilhas do Abrigo e Guararitama Wildlife Refuge.
The new units were carved out of the ecological station.
On 11 September 2007 the procurer general of the state declared that law 12.406 was unconstitutional.
On 10 June 2009 a judgement upheld the finding of unconstitutionality.

Law 14.982 of 8 April 2013 again altered the limits of the Juréia-Itatins Ecological Station, re-categorising some areas.
These again included the Ilhas do Abrigo e Guararitama Wildlife Refuge.
The law recreated the Jureia-Itatins Mosaic, this time covering .

Notes

Sources

2013 establishments in Brazil
Protected areas of São Paulo (state)
Wildlife refuges of Brazil